Virbia subapicalis is a moth in the family Erebidae first described by Francis Walker in 1854. It is found in Brazil, Ecuador, Peru, Guyana, Suriname, Venezuela and Bolivia.

References

subapicalis
Moths described in 1854